A solar gravitational lens (or solar gravity lens) (SGL) is a theoretical method of using the Sun as a large lens with a physical effect called gravitational lensing. It is considered the best method to directly image habitable exoplanets.

The solar gravitational lens is characterized by remarkable properties: it offers brightness amplification of up to a factor of ~ (at ) and extreme angular resolution (~ arcsec).

Albert Einstein predicted in 1936 that rays of light from the same direction that skirt the edges of the Sun would converge to a focal point approximately 542 AUs from the Sun.  A probe positioned at this distance from the Sun could use it as a gravitational lens for magnifying distant objects on the opposite side of the Sun. The probe's location could shift around as needed to select different targets relative to the Sun.  In 1979, Von Eshleman was the first author proposing to use the Sun as a large lens.

A probe called SETIsail and later FOCAL was proposed to the ESA in 1993, but is expected to be a difficult task. If a probe does pass 542 AU, magnification capabilities of the lens will continue to act at farther distances, as the rays that come to a focus at larger distances pass further away from the distortions of the Sun's corona.

In 2020, NASA physicist Slava Turyshev presented his idea of direct multi-pixel imaging and spectroscopy of an exoplanet with a solar gravitational lens mission. The lens could reconstruct the exoplanet image with ~25 km-scale surface resolution in 6 months of integration time, enough to see surface features and signs of habitability.  His proposal was selected for the Phase III of the NIAC 2020 (NASA Institute for Advanced Concepts).  Turyshev proposes to use realistic-sized solar sails (~16 vanes of 103 m2) to achieve the needed high velocity at perihelion (~150 km/sec), reaching 547 AU in 17 years.

See also 
 Einstein ring

References 

Astronomical imaging
Space exploration
Exoplanets
Space probes
NASA programs
Proposed telescopes